Statistics of the Scottish Football League in season 1901–02.

Scottish League Division One

Scottish League Division Two

See also
1901–02 in Scottish football

References

 
1901-02